Kauksi may refer to several places in Estonia:

Kauksi, Ida-Viru County, village in Alutaguse Parish, Ida-Viru County
Kauksi, Põlva County, village in Põlva Parish, Põlva County